Reading's location in the Thames Valley at the confluence of the River Thames and River Kennet, and on both the Great Western Main Line and the M4 motorway, some  west of London has made the town an important location in the nation's transport system.

River

The town grew up as a river port at the confluence of the River Thames and River Kennet. Both of these rivers are navigable, and the locks of Caversham Lock, Blake's Lock, County Lock, Fobney Lock and Southcote Lock are all within the borough. Today navigation is exclusively leisure oriented, with private and hire boats dominating traffic.

Scheduled boat services operate on the Thames, operating from wharves on the Reading side of the river near Caversham Bridge. Salters Steamers operate a summer daily service from just downstream of the bridge to Henley-on-Thames, taking around two hours in each direction and calling at the riverside villages of Sonning and Shiplake. Thames River Cruises operate trips from just upstream of the bridge, including a service on summer weekends and bank holidays to Mapledurham, taking 45 minutes in each direction and allowing two hours ashore for visits to Mapledurham Watermill and Mapledurham House.

Road

Reading was a major staging point on the old Bath Road (A4) from London to Bath and Bristol. This road still carries local traffic, but has now been replaced for long-distance traffic by the M4 motorway, which closely skirts the borough and serves it with three junctions (J10-J12). Other main roads serving Reading include the A33 from Basingstoke, the A327 from Farnborough, the A329 from Bracknell to Thame, the A4074 to Oxford, and the A4155 to Henley-on-Thames.

Within Reading there is the Inner Distribution Road (IDR), a ring road for local traffic movements. The A329(M), A33 and A4 national routes link the town with junctions 10, 11 and 12 of the M4 motorway respectively. The IDR is linked with the M4 by the A33 relief road, which runs past the Madejski Stadium and Green Park Business complex. National Express Coaches run out of Mereoak park and Ride, at Junction 11 of the M4.

The River Thames is crossed by both Reading and Caversham road bridges, while several road bridges cross the Kennet. There is a long-running debate about constructing a third bridge across the Thames, to the east of the existing bridges. Some people believe that this will remove one of the town's bottlenecks and ease traffic congestion. Others believe that it will induce more traffic, move bottle necks and open up swathes of South Oxfordshire to unwanted development. However, the proximity of the county border means that any such route will have to pass through South Oxfordshire, and this development has so far been blocked by its residents and politicians.

Rail 

Reading is a major junction point on the National Rail system, and as a consequence Reading station is a major transfer point as well as serving heavy originating and terminating traffic.  Plans have been agreed to rebuild Reading station, with grade separation of some conflicting traffic flows and extra platforms, to relieve severe congestion at this station.

Railway lines link Reading to both Paddington and Waterloo stations in London. The route to Paddington offers both non-stop (taking around 30 minutes) and stopping services, whilst that to Waterloo offers only a stopping service, however this service does give Reading direct links with Richmond and Clapham Junction.

Other stations in the Reading area are Reading West, Tilehurst and Earley, but all serve local trains only. Green Park railway station is planned on the Reading to Basingstoke Line to serve Green Park Business Park.

Reading serves as the western terminus of Elizabeth line with services currently running through Central London to Abbey Wood.

Since December 2019, passengers are able to use contactless payments between Reading and London Paddington.

Air

There have been two airfields in Reading, one at Coley Park and one at Woodley, but these have both closed. Today Reading is within reach of several international airports.

An express bus service named RailAir links Reading with Heathrow, or the airport can be accessed by changing at Hayes & Harlington railway station from the local rail service to Paddington to the TfL Rail service.

The airport at London City can also be reached by a combination of rail services.

Southampton and Birmingham airports are both accessible by direct train.

Public transport

The first local public transport started in 1878 with the Reading Tramways Company then (part of the Imperial Tramways Company) operating a horse tram route on an east–west alignment from Oxford Road through Broad Street in the town centre to Cemetery Junction. Significantly, this route formed the core of what became known as the main line of the network.

The new electric trams started operating in July 1903. Extensions were constructed to the Wokingham Road and London Road (both from Cemetery Junction), and new routes added to Whitley, Caversham Road, Erleigh Road and Bath Road. The trams operated from a new depot in Mill Lane, a site that was to remain Reading Buses' main depot until it was demolished to make way for The Oracle shopping mall in 1998.

The first trolleybus wiring erected was a training loop on Erleigh Road, which opened in early 1936. During World War II a trolleybus branch was constructed from the Oxford Road to Kentwood Hill, enabling trolleybuses to replace motor buses with a consequential saving in precious oil based fuel. Reading Corporation decided to abandon the trolleybus system, and the routes were phased out between January 1967 and November 1968.

Today local public transport is largely road-based, and can be affected by peak hour congestion in the borough. A frequent local bus network within the borough, and a less frequent network in the surrounding area, is provided by Reading Buses. Other bus operators include First Berkshire & The Thames Valley, Arriva Shires & Essex and Thames Travel. ReadiBus provides an on-demand transport service for people with restricted mobility in the area.

Since 2004, Reading Transport and Reading Borough Council have made a significant investment in upgrading the quality of Reading's main urban bus routes. In late 2007, Reading Buses placed an order with Scania for 14 new ethanol fuelled double decker buses to replace the existing fleet of biodiesel powered vehicles operating premier route 17. At the time the order was placed, this was the largest order for ethanol fuelled buses in the UK. These buses started work on 26 May 2008.

Cycling
The OYBike bicycle sharing system operated in Reading, with approximately 15 bicycles with docking stations at Reading station, Holiday Inn (Basingstoke Road) and Green Park.
In March 2011 Reading Borough Council approved a larger scheme similar to the London Cycle Hire Scheme, with 1,000 bicycles available at up to 150 docking stations across Reading. The scheme, ReadyBike, began in 2014 but closed on 31 March 2019. After an initial government funding subsidy ended it was being subsidised by Reading Borough Council by £10,000 per month.

References

External links